Baby farming is the historical practice of accepting custody of an infant or child in exchange for payment in late-Victorian Britain and, less commonly, in Australia and the United States.  If the infant was young, this usually included wet-nursing (breast-feeding by a woman not the mother). Some baby farmers "adopted" children for lump-sum payments, while others cared for infants for periodic payments.

Description
Though baby farmers were paid in the understanding that care would be provided, the term "baby farmer" was used as an insult, and improper treatment was usually implied.  Illegitimacy and its attendant social stigma were usually the impetus for a mother's decision to put her children "out to nurse" with a baby farmer, but baby farming also encompassed foster care and adoption in the period before they were regulated by British law.

Wealthier women would also put their infants out to be cared for in the homes of villagers.  Claire Tomalin gives a detailed account of this in her biography of Jane Austen, who was fostered in this manner, as were all her siblings, from a few months old until they were toddlers. Tomalin emphasizes the emotional distance this created.

Particularly in the case of lump-sum adoptions, it was more profitable for the baby farmer if the infant or child she adopted died, since the small payment could not cover the care of the child for long. Some baby farmers adopted numerous children and then neglected them or murdered them outright (see infanticide). Several were tried for murder, manslaughter, or criminal neglect and were hanged. Margaret Waters (executed 1870) and Amelia Dyer (executed 1896) were two infamous British baby farmers, as were Amelia Sach and Annie Walters (executed 1903). The last baby farmer to be executed in Britain was Rhoda Willis, who was hanged in Wales in 1907.

The only woman to be executed in New Zealand, Minnie Dean, was a baby farmer. In Australia, baby-farmer Frances Knorr was executed for infanticide in 1894.

In Scandinavia there was a euphemism for this activity: änglamakerska (Swedish, including Hilda Nilsson) and englemagerske (Danish), both literally meaning a female "angel maker".

Decline
An undercover investigation of baby-farming, reported in 1870 in a letter to The Times, concluded that "My conviction is that children are murdered in scores by these women, that adoption is only a fine phrase for slow or sudden death".

Spurred by a series of articles that appeared in the British Medical Journal in 1867, the Parliament of the United Kingdom began to regulate baby farming in 1872 with the passage of the Infant Life Protection Act 1872.

Athelstan Braxton Hicks, the London coroner, gave evidence in 1896 on the dangers of baby-farming to the Select Committee on Infant Life Protection Bill. One case that he cited was that of Mrs Arnold who had been 'sweating' infants legally by doing so one at a time. At another inquest the jury were of the "opinion that there has been gross neglect in the case" but were unable to allocate responsibility. They added the rider that "The jury are strongly of opinion that further legislation in what are usually known as baby farming cases is greatly needed, and particularly that the required legislation should extend to the care of one infant only, and that the age of the infant should not be limited to one year, but rather to five years and that it should be an offence for any person undertaking the care of such infant to sub farm it."

The Infant Life Protection Act 1897 finally empowered local authorities to control the registration of nurses responsible for more than one infant under the age of five for a period longer than 48 hours. Under the Children Act 1908 "no infant could be kept in a home that was so unfit and so overcrowded as to endanger its health, and no infant could be kept by an unfit nurse who threatened, by neglect or abuse, its proper care and maintenance."

A series of acts passed over the next seventy years, including the Children Act 1908 and the Adoption of Children (Regulation) Act 1939, gradually placed adoption and foster care under the protection and regulation of the state.

Postwar Britain 
In the 1960s and 70s, thousands of West African children were privately fostered by white families in the UK in a phenomenon known as 'farming'. The biological parents were usually students in the UK who also had a job. They placed ads in the newspapers looking for foster families to care for their children.

In popular culture
The title character in Charles Dickens' Oliver Twist spends his first years in a "baby farm."
The eponymous heroine puts her newborn "out to nurse" with a baby farmer in George Moore's Esther Waters (1894).
The main character in Perfume, Jean-Baptiste Grenouille, is orphaned shortly after birth and brought up in a baby farmer style orphanage.
The character of Mrs Sucksby in Sarah Waters's  novel Fingersmith is a baby farmer.
In the Gilbert and Sullivan operetta H.M.S. Pinafore, the character of Buttercup reveals that, when a baby farmer, she had switched two babies of different social classes.  This is part of a satire of class hierarchy in Victorian England.
The book Mama's Babies by Gary Crew is the story of a child of a baby farmer in the 1890s.
The silent film Sparrows (1926) with Mary Pickford was set in a baby farm in the Southern swamps.
In The Fire Thief trilogy of novels, a baby farm figures prominently.
The plot of Emma Donoghue's Frog Music is initiated by the protagonist retrieving her son from a baby farm.
Australian musical The Hatpin features a mother's experience with baby farmers and was inspired by the true story of Amber Murray and the Makin family.
Australian poet Judith Rodriguez has written a series of poems based on Melbourne baby farmer Frances Knorr in The Hanging of Minnie Thwaites.
The BBC TV soap opera EastEnders features an evil character called Babe Smith, who is exposed as a baby farmer along with Queenie Trott. It is revealed that while in Ramsgate, they took young pregnant women in and sold their babies to the highest bidder. 
In a March 2013 episode of Syfy's Haunted Collector, John Zaffis and his team discovered that a Boston cigar bar used to house a baby farm in the 1870s. Ms. Elwood, who ran the farm, was found to have abused and even killed some of the infants there. They also found a syringe buried in the building's foundation dating to the time period of the farm.

See also
Helene Auguste Geisen-Volk, baby farm owner convicted of murdering 53 babies under her care
John and Sarah Makin, Australian baby farmers convicted of murdering 16 babies they adopted
Frances Knorr, baby farmer owner convicted of strangling one infant under her care

References

External links

"Baby farming" from the Adoption History Project
Homrighaus, Ruth Ellen. Baby Farming: The Care of Illegitimate Children in England, 1860–1943. Ph.D. diss., 2003. Rev. ed., 2010, at Historytools.
Baby farmers (NZHistory.net.nz)

Baby farming
Child abuse
Child care occupations
Class discrimination
Infancy
Obsolete occupations
Population
Victorian era
Wet nursing